The term Her Majesty's Loyal Opposition or Her Majesty's Most Loyal Opposition may refer to:

 His Majesty's Most Loyal Opposition (Gibraltar), the official opposition in Gibraltar
 His Majesty's Most Loyal Opposition (United Kingdom), the official opposition in the United Kingdom
 Official Opposition (Bermuda), the official opposition in Bermuda which is called His Majesty's Loyal Opposition
 Official Opposition (Canada), the official opposition in Canada which is called His Majesty's Loyal Opposition
 Official Opposition (New Zealand), the official opposition in New Zealand which is called His Majesty's Loyal Opposition

See also
 Parliamentary opposition

Parliamentary opposition